Gabaglio Antonio (30 June 1840, Pavia, Italy – 14 November 1909, Pavia, Italy) was an Italian statistician.

Biography
He graduated in law in 1862 at the University of Pavia.  His devotion to the research is confirmed by two works published in 1871: Della proprietà. Dissertazione (Pavia) e L'industria e la scienza. Discorso (Genova).  In January 1878 he obtained the lectureship in statistics at the University of Pavia. When in Italy the chairs of statistics were still scarce and often were associated with the teaching of political economy, he tried to provide to Statistics  the character of "Science" and "method", and to introduce mathematics in order to  support  statistical computations.  The first work on methodological statistics due to Gabaglio appeared in the winter of 1880  and it was  La storia e teoria della statistica, published in Milan by Hoepli. The study consisted of an extensive and detailed methodological section. The volume was met with broad consensus in the scientific world, and in February 1880, the technical education division of the Ministry of Education appointed Gabaglio as Cavaliere dell'Ordine dei Ss. Maurizio e Lazzaro. Strengthened by this recognition, he  wrote in 1888  an opera entitled Teoria generale della statistica, again published by Hoepli. Gabaglio made a strong effort for the affirmation of  the mathematical method in a discipline traditionally taught in the Faculty of Law. In the late 1980s,  he  left the Chair of statistics at the University of Pavia and returned to teach in the Technical Institute, from which he came.  He died at Pavia on 14 November 1909.

Considered one of the main researchers that transitioned the field of statistics from pure description of the facts to a scientific method based on mathematics.

Gabaglio provided a new perspective in the development of the statistical method. He said "statistics may be interpreted in an extended and in a restricted sense. In the former sense it is a method, in the latter a science. As a science it studies the actual social-political order by means of mathematical induction."

Academic positions
Teacher of Statistics and economic studies at the Tech Institute of Pavia (1868–1872), Teacher of Political economy, statistics, and scientific elements of civil ethic, and law at the Industrial and Professional Institute of Pavia (1873), Full Professor of Statistics at the Faculty of Law at the University of Pavia (1878).

Honors and awards
Cavaliere dell'Ordine dei Ss. Maurizio e Lazzaro (1880).

Publications
 Storia e teoria generale della Statistica, Milano, Hoepli, 1880 
 Teoria generale della Statistica, Milano, Ulrico Hoepli, 1888–89

External links
 
 https://sites.google.com/site/dizionariosis/dizionario-statistico/statistici-e-f-g-h/gabaglio-antonio

Italian statisticians
1840 births
1909 deaths
Scientists from Pavia
University of Pavia alumni